Christopher Mason may refer to:
Christopher Mason, character in the 2007 novel The Russian Concubine
Christopher E. Mason, professor at Weill Cornell Medicine

See also
Chris Mason (disambiguation)